Walter Seitl (15 March 1941 – 5 September 1982) was an Austrian footballer.

References

External links
 Rapid Archiv

1941 births
1982 deaths
Austrian footballers
Austria international footballers
Association football forwards
SK Rapid Wien players
FC Red Bull Salzburg players